Mirigu Senior High School (also known as MISCO) is a second-cycle institution in the Kassena Nankana Municipal District in the Upper East Region of Ghana. In 2019, the school took part in the National Science and Maths Quiz organized in the Upper East region.

References 

Education in Ghana
High schools in Ghana